Miss América Latina or Miss América Latina del Mundo, known in English as Miss Latin America or Miss Latin America of the World, is an international beauty contest held annually.  It is organized by the Miss América Latina Organization.  Despite its name, the contest is not restricted to only Latin American nations.  It is designed for women of Latina descent around the globe.  There is an average of about 20 contestants every year.  It has two sister pageants: Miss Latina US (which selects the US delegate to Miss América Latina) and Miss Teen US Latina.

The current titleholder is Yosdany Navarro from Venezuela.

History 

The Miss América Latina pageant was founded in the early 1980s. The first edition was held in 1981, when it was open to only Latina contestants in Miami, Florida, United States. In 1983, the contest went international.

Miss Latin America 2021 

Miss Latin America 2021 took place on October 14, 2021, at the Occidental Caribe Resort in Punta Cana, Dominican Republic. 15 delegates participated in the event.  At the conclusion of the final event USA Latina's Nancy Gomez crowned Venezuela's Yosdany Navarro. Navarro became the fourth Venezuelan woman to win the contest.  The runners-up were Daiara Stein (Brazil), Brianna Lorena (USA Latina), Chris Aguilar (Panama) and Flavia Núñez (Peru).

Titleholders

Number of titleholders by country 

* The first two Miss Latin America contests were only open to women living in Miami. Although the winners of both contests are regarded as official Miss Latin America titleholders, their wins do not appear in the United States' tally.

See also 
 List of beauty contests

Notes

References

External links 
Official website

 
International beauty pageants
Continental beauty pageants
Beauty pageants for people of specific ethnic or national descents